Jean-Guy Laforest (born March 11, 1944) is a retired business owner and former political figure in New Brunswick, Canada. He represented Grand Falls Region in the Legislative Assembly of New Brunswick from 1999 to 2003 as a Progressive Conservative member.

He was born in Grand Falls, New Brunswick, the son of Armand Laforest. He studied at the Bathurst Technical School. Laforest worked as a barber, then as a metal polisher, machine operator and later as a foreman at a manufacturing plant. From 1979 to 1987, he owned and operated a restaurant and night club in Madawaska, Maine. He was a school bus driver in Grand Falls from 1990 to 1999. He was defeated when he ran for reelection in 2003.

References 
 New Brunswick MLAs, New Brunswick Legislative Library (pdf)

1944 births
Living people
People from Grand Falls, New Brunswick
Progressive Conservative Party of New Brunswick MLAs
21st-century Canadian politicians